Kinga is a Bantu language of the Kinga tribe in Tanzania. It is closely related to Magoma, but mutual intelligibility is low.

References

Languages of Tanzania
Northeast Bantu languages